Syutkin or Siutkin is a Russian surname. It may refer to one of the following persons:

Valeri Syutkin (born 1958), singer
Pavel Syutkin, Hero of Russian Federation, World War II veteran 

Russian-language surnames